The New York Central Hudson was a popular 4-6-4 "Hudson" type steam locomotive built by the American Locomotive Company (ALCO) and the Lima Locomotive Works in three series from 1927 to 1938 for the New York Central Railroad. Named after the Hudson River, the 4-6-4 wheel arrangement came to be known as the "Hudson" type in the United States, as these locomotives were the first examples built and used in North America. Built for high-speed passenger train work, the Hudson locomotives were famously known for hauling the New York Central's crack passenger trains, such as the 20th Century Limited and the Empire State Express. With the onset of diesel locomotives by the mid-20th Century, all Hudson locomotives were retired and subsequently scrapped by 1957,  with none preserved today except for a converted tender from J-1d 5313, which is preserved at the Steamtown National Historic Site in Scranton, Pennsylvania.

History
The Chicago, Milwaukee, St. Paul & Pacific Railroad (Milwaukee Road) was the first to design a 4-6-4 locomotive (naming them Baltics); however, they were not built until after the New York Central's Hudsons. NYC President Patrick E. Crowley named the units Hudsons after the Hudson River, which divides New York State's Hudson Valley and streams broadly past New York City.

The Hudson came into being because the existing 4-6-2 Pacific power was not able to keep up with the demands of longer, heavier trains and higher speeds. Given NYC's axle load limits, Pacifics could not be made any larger; a new locomotive type would be required to carry the larger boilers. Lima Locomotive Works' conception of superpower steam as realized in the 2-8-4 Berkshire type was the predecessor to the Hudson. The 2-8-4's 4-wheel trailing truck permitted a huge firebox to be located after the boiler. The resulting greater steaming rate ensured that such a locomotive would never run out of power at speed, a common failing of older locomotives. Applying the ideas of the freight-minded Berkshire type to the Pacific resulted in a 4-6-4 locomotive.

NYC ordered prototype No. 5200 from Alco, and subjected it to intensive testing. A fleet of 205 J-1 class Hudsons were eventually built, including 30 each for the Michigan Central Railroad (MC road numbers 8200-8229) and the Cleveland, Cincinnati, Chicago & St. Louis Railway (“Big Four” - road numbers 6600-6629). In addition, NYC subsidiary Boston & Albany Railroad ordered 20 J-2 class (B&A road numbers 600-619), the latter 10 from Lima Locomotive Works (all other NYC Hudsons were built by Alco’s Schenectady works). A later development were 50 J-3a class Super Hudsons in 1937–1938, with many modern appliances and innovations. After the MC, Big 4, and B&A locomotives were incorporated into the NYC numbering, the NYC Hudson locomotives had road numbers ranging from 5200 to 5474. The NYC J-1 road numbers were 5200-5344, the MC J-1s became NYC 5345-5374, the Big 4 J-1s became NYC 5375-5404, the J-2s (all from B&A) became NYC road numbers 5455-5474, and the J-3 road numbers were 5405-5454. The J-2 numbers are last because they were transferred to the NYC after the J-3 deliveries.

Streamlining
The Hudsons were of excellent quality. In response to the styling sensation of the new diesel-powered Zephyr streamliner, Locomotive No. 5344 (the last J-1e) was fitted with an Art Deco streamlined shroud designed by Carl F. Kantola and was named Commodore Vanderbilt on December 27, 1934. The streamlining was later replaced to match the last ten J-3a Super Hudson locomotives (5445-5454) that had been built with streamlining designed by Henry Dreyfuss. J-1e Hudson #5344 stuck out from the rest of the roster, as it was the only J-1 to be streamlined, and was one of two locomotives ever to be streamlined twice (the other being a Baltimore and Ohio P-7, number 5304). Two more J-3a locomotives (5426 & 5429) had a 3rd streamlining style fitted in 1941 for Empire State Express service. The streamlined locomotives featured prominently in NYC advertising.

The forte of all Hudsons was power at top speed. They were poor performers at low speed and the presence of a booster engine on the trailing truck was an absolute necessity for starting. For this reason, they were generally favored by railroads with flat terrain and straight routes. After the NYC, the Milwaukee Road was also fond of the Hudsons, acquiring 22 class F6 and six streamlined class F7s. The Atchison, Topeka & Santa Fe Railway also had 16, while the New York, New Haven & Hartford Railroad had 10 (#1400-1409) streamlined I-5 4-6-4s built by Baldwin in 1937 (nicknamed "Shoreliners"). Few railroads with hilly terrain acquired any.

A booster was prone to troubles, however, and gradually fell out of favor. Instead of a complicated booster, it was deemed preferential to have an extra pair of driving wheels, and thus better traction.

On September 7, 1943, No. 5450 suffered a boiler explosion in Canastota, New York, killing three enginemen and putting her out of service until the end of World War II due to a steel shortage.

Trials of later, dual-purpose 4-8-2 Mohawks sealed the Hudson'''s fate. The L-3 and L-4 Mohawks were nice, but they were still more suited to lower-speed hauling than high-speed power. In 1944, NYC received permission from the War Production Board to build a new, high-speed locomotive of the 4-8-4 type, combining all the advantages of the Hudson with those of the Mohawk. Many other railroads had taken to the 4-8-4 in the 1930s, generally calling them Northerns after the Northern Pacific Railway, which had first adopted them. By being a late adopter, the NYC had the chance to build on everyone else's experience. That locomotive proved to be exceptional, and the type on the NYC was named the Niagara. Since only 27 were built, however, they only took over the heaviest and most-prestigious trains, and the last Niagara (No. 6015) was retired in July, 1956. Many Hudsons soldiered-on until the end of steam on NYC in 1957.

Unfortunately, none of the NYC Hudson units survive; all were scrapped when the railroad dieselized, all were replaced by EMD E8. Two J-1d class Hudsons, numbers 5311 and 5313, were sold to the Toronto, Hamilton and Buffalo Railway in 1948 and were renumbered 501 and 502 respectively. Both locomotives were retired and scrapped in 1954 when the TH&B dieselized. The tender from the 502 (formerly the 5313) was retained by the TH&B and converted to a steam generator car for use on passenger trains. The generator car still survives today and is part of the Steamtown National Historic Site collection.

Popular culture

The character Connor from the Thomas & Friends television series is stylized after a streamlined NYC Hudson.
NYC Hudsons are featured on the covers of Van Halen's 2012 album A Different Kind of Truth, the Commodores 1975 album Movin' On, Three Dog Night's 1975 album Coming Down Your Way, and the 2020 Dennis DeYoung album ‘’26 East : Volume 1’’.
In Pocket Trains, there is a steam locomotive called the Century Limited. It resembles a streamlined Dreyfuss J-3 4-6-4 locomotive but is a 2-6-4 locomotive in the game. It is also the only steam locomotive in the game with side rods.
In the Courage the Cowardly Dog episode "The Mask", a steam locomotive loosely based on a streamlined NYC J-3a Hudson was seen pulling an Amtrak passenger train which destroyed Mad Dog's car near the end of the episode.
In the movie The Iron Giant, a steam locomotive resembling a NYC J-3a Hudson was pulling a coal train that crashed into the Giant while he was trying to fix the train tracks he ate at the railroad crossing.
In season 5 episode 6 of The Big Bang Theory, "The Rhinitis Revelation", a "New Empire State Express" poster can be briefly seen on the back of Sheldon Cooper's door at the very end of the episode when Leonard interrupts Mary Cooper singing Soft Kitty.
 In The Grand Tour, the J-3 Hudson can be seen in the opening part of the show. Its valve gear is incorrectly animated.
In How I Met Your Mother a poster of the New York Central Hudson can be seen in Ted Mosby's apartment, above the fireplace.
The icon for the app Transport Tycoon, a version of Chris Sawyer's Locomotion for mobile devices, depicts a locomotive that closely resembles the New York Central Hudson.
In Transformers: Revenge of the Fallen, a J-3a Dreyfuss appears in a vintage photo that was kept by Seymour Simmons in which the Hudson is confirmed as a Seeker by Autobot Wheelie.
In the Rugrats episode "Murmur on the Ornery Express", there is a steam locomotive called "Biendeltown Express", which resembles a NYC streamlined NYC J-3a Hudson.
In the movie Everyone's Hero, there is a steam locomotive that resembles a NYC J-1e Hudson. A streamlined J-3a Dreyfuss Super Hudson can be seen on a poster in a train station.
The exact same above photo of the Streamlined Hudson at the 1939 New York World's Fair appears, framed, on the wall of Sam Lowry's apartment in Terry Gilliam's Brazil (1985 film) in the scene where Archibald Tuttle (played by Robert De Niro) is fixing Sam Lowry's faulty air conditioning system. Sam Lowry is played by Jonathan Pryce.
In the SpongeBob SquarePants episode "The Great Patty Caper'', there is a steam locomotive called the "Oceanic Express", which loosely resembles a NYC J-1a Hudson.
In the short film Lorenzo, there is a silhouette that resembles a NYC J-1e Hudson.

Model trains
The Lionel Corporation has issued the Hudson in 1937, 1946, 1947, 1950, 1964, 1984, 1990, 2001, 2011 and 2019. The first model issued, in 1937, was made for special 'T-Rail' track and numbered 5344. It was also the first mass-produced scale model train, numbered '700e' by Lionel, with 'e' designating it as having an electronic reversing unit, or 'e unit'. The Hudson from 1946 and 1947, numbered 221 and made with Dreyfuss streamlining, was made in a grey paint scheme for the NYC railroad. It was the only grey steam locomotive produced by Lionel during the postwar years. The 1950 and 1964 version was for O-Gauge Tubular track and numbered 773. The 1987 Hudson was released for O-Gauge Tubular track and numbered 783. The 2011 'legacy' Hudson was numbered 5344 like the 1937 Hudson but made for O Gauge FasTrack, Tubular, or Atlas O Gauge track.

MTH has also issued the Hudson since the late 1980s and early 1990s.

Broadway Limited Imports built an HO scale version of the Dreyfuss Hudson in a brass-hybrid material for their Paragon 2 lineup. Complete with scullin wheels and prototype whistle, these models were sold alongside the NYC Niagara of the same model railroad scale. While MTH Dreyfuss Hudson HO scale models are somewhat abundant, BLI models are now a rarity, as BLI has discontinued the model.

The A.C. Gilbert Company produced the Hudson in their American Flyer S Gauge line from 1946 to 1964. This represented the standard J-3a configuration rather than any of the streamlined versions.

The Marx Toy Company produced a non-streamlined 1898 Hudson in their 027 style line from 1954 to 1963. In 1935 Marx released tinplate 
toy trains in windup and electric named the Commodore Vanderbilt.

Bachmann Trains released its accurately scaled version of the J-3a Super Hudson'' in N scale early in 2021. It features a diecast metal boiler and its trademarked Econami SoundTraxx sound package.

See also
 Delaware, Lackawanna and Western 1151 class

References

Bibliography

Further reading

4-6-4 locomotives
New York Central Railroad locomotives
Streamlined steam locomotives
ALCO locomotives
Lima locomotives
Passenger locomotives
Steam locomotives of the United States
Scrapped locomotives
Railway locomotives introduced in 1927
Standard gauge railway locomotives